François III d’Orléans (1570 – 1631), Duke of Château-Thierry and of Fronsac, Count of Saint-Pol was governor of Orléans, Blois and Tours and a general of the French Wars of Religion. He was the second born son of Eleonor of Neuchâtel.

François III was created Count of Saint-Pol in 1601. In January 1608, he inherited the title of Duke of Fronsac when his only son, Léonor II, 1st Duke of Fronsac died without an heir.

1570 births
1631 deaths
Dukes of Fronsac
Counts of Saint-Pol
17th-century peers of France